Rochel Gelman (born January 23, 1942) is an emeritus psychology professor at Rutgers University, New Brunswick, NJ, and Co-Director of the Center for Cognitive Science. Gallistel is married to fellow psychologist C. Randy Gallistel. Prior to joining the Rutgers faculty she taught at the University of California, Los Angeles.

Awards and honors
Dr. Gelman is a member of the National Academy of Sciences, winner of the 1995 Distinguished Scientific Contribution Award from the American Psychological Association (APA), a Fellow of the American Academy of Arts and Sciences, the Cognitive Science Society, and a William James Fellow of the American Psychological Society. She also serves as a member of the Scientific Advisory Board for the False Memory Syndrome Foundation (FMSF).

Dr. Gelman was featured on Closer to the Truth: Science, Meaning and the Future, a PBS series created, produced, and hosted by Dr. Robert Lawrence Kuhn.

References

External links
Profile at Rutgers University's Cognitive Development and Learning Lab

Living people
1942 births
Canadian psychologists
Developmental psychologists
Educational psychologists
Fellows of the Society of Experimental Psychologists
Fellows of the American Academy of Arts and Sciences
Members of the United States National Academy of Sciences
University of Toronto alumni
University of California, Los Angeles alumni
University of Pennsylvania faculty
Rutgers University faculty
Cognitive development researchers
Fellows of the Cognitive Science Society